Ceyranlı (also, Dzheyranly and Orta Emirkhanly) is a village in the Davachi Rayon of Azerbaijan.  The village forms part of the municipality of Vələsli.

References 

Populated places in Shabran District